Porpoise Bay Provincial Park is a provincial park in British Columbia, Canada.

External links

BC Parks Web Page
Camping at Porpoise Bay
 Sunshine Coast Parks

Provincial parks of British Columbia
Sunshine Coast Regional District
1971 establishments in British Columbia
Protected areas established in 1971